Elizabeth Hills is a suburb of western Sydney, in the state of New South Wales, Australia. It is located 39 kilometres south-west of the Sydney central business district, in the local government area of Liverpool. Elizabeth Hills was gazetted as a suburb on 18 December 2009. Like the neighbouring suburb of Len Waters Estate, Elizabeth Hills had previously been part of the suburb of Cecil Hills.

History
Formerly farmlands, it is now a predominantly residential estate with housing developments mostly beginning in 2014. The suburb was named after Lady Elizabeth Wylde, the wife of the first landowner in the area who occupied and managed a farm situated at Cecil Hills from 1816 until her death in 1864.

Demographics
In the 2016 Census, there were 2,535 people in Elizabeth Hills. 51.6% of people were born in Australia. The next most common country of birth was Iraq at 17.5%.  31.0% of people spoke only English at home. Other languages spoken at home included Assyrian Neo-Aramaic 15.0%, Chaldean Neo-Aramaic 8.1%, Arabic 7.2%, Vietnamese 5.1% and Serbian 4.1%. The most common responses for religion were Catholic 41.9%, Buddhism 8.7%, Assyrian Apostolic 8.4%, No Religion 7.1% and Eastern Orthodox 6.7%.

Transport
Transit Systems operates the 827 bus route with services to Liverpool via Bonnyrigg Heights, Green Valley and Heckenberg. It also has connections with the M7 Motorway with the nearby Cowpasture Road exit to the south, and the Elizabeth Drive exit to the north.

Schools
Cecil Hills High School, established in 1996, is just outside Elizabeth Hills's boundaries in Cecil Hills which serves as the main secondary school. Cecil Hills Public School is also nearby.

References

Suburbs of Sydney
City of Liverpool (New South Wales)